Bokermannohyla circumdata is a species of frog in the family Hylidae.
It is endemic to Brazil.
Its natural habitats are subtropical or tropical moist lowland forests, subtropical or tropical moist montane forests, and rivers.
It is threatened by habitat loss.

References

Bokermannohyla
Endemic fauna of Brazil
Amphibians described in 1871
Taxonomy articles created by Polbot